"The Riddle" is a song by English singer-songwriter Nik Kershaw, released in 1984 as the lead single from his second studio album of the same name. Kershaw described the lyrical content as being nondescript to fill as a "guide vocal" for the production. It reached number three on the UK Singles Chart and peaked within the top 10 in countries like Ireland, Norway, Sweden, Australia and New Zealand. An accompanying music video was made for the song and features references to Lewis Carroll's book Alice's Adventures in Wonderland (1865).

The song was covered by many artists, including Gigi D'Agostino (1999) and Jack Holiday and Mike Candys (2012).

Lyrics
The "riddling" lyrics caused speculation among listeners as to their meaning; Kershaw states that there is in fact no intended meaning at all, the words simply being a "guide vocal" thrown together to fit the music. Kershaw has stated: "In short, 'The Riddle' is nonsense, rubbish, bollocks, the confused ramblings of an 80s popstar."

Music video
The music video to "The Riddle" depicts Kershaw walking through a house shaped like a question mark, making his way through certain obstacles and looking through drawers while singing. The video depicts many references to Lewis Carroll's book Alice's Adventures in Wonderland (1865) with an appearance of a young girl exiting the room through a small door, two portly gentlemen who resemble Tweedledum and Tweedledee and an observation made by Kershaw to Through the Looking-Glass (1871).

At the beginning of the music video, Kershaw is seen trying to get through a door with a screwdriver. The video ends with the camera moving up away from Kershaw to reveal that the question mark is lying in an alleyway, at which point, a man in a green costume seen earlier in the video comes and picks it up. The green man is the Riddler, a villain from the Batman comics.

Two versions of the video exist, with minor differences.

Track listing
7" Single (WEA NIK 6)
A "The Riddle" - 3:52	
B "Progress" (Live) - 3:02

12" Single (WEA NIKT 6)
A "The Riddle" (Extended Riddle) - 5:08
B "Progress" (Live) - 3:02

Cassette Single (WEA NIKC 6)
A1 "The Riddle" - 3:52
A2 "Interview"		
A3 "Progress" (Live) - 3:02
B1 "I Won't Let the Sun Go Down on Me" (Extended Mix)		
B2 "Wouldn't It Be Good" (Extended Mix)

Credits
"The Riddle"
Produced by Peter Collins

"Progress"
Recorded Live at Hammersmith Odeon.
Mixed by Simon Boswell

"The Riddle (Extended Riddle)"
Produced by Peter Collins
The extended mix is named "Special Extended Mix" on the cover and "Extended Riddle" on the label.

Charts

Weekly charts

Year-end charts

Gigi D'Agostino version

"The Riddle" was covered as a dance song by Italian DJ Gigi D'Agostino, featuring uncredited vocals by British singer Adam Austin. This version was released on D'Agostino's second studio album, L'Amour Toujours (1999). The same lyrics are used as in Kershaw's song, but the order is changed and the tempo is faster.

Music video
The music video, which was made by Andreas Hykade, features La Linea-styled animation like the "Bla Bla Bla" music video (both of which feature the same humanoid character), taking place entirely with white lines on a light green background and features the aforementioned character fighting a dragon on a mountainous terrain.

Weekly charts

Year-end charts

Certifications

Jack Holiday and Mike Candys version

"The Riddle" was covered as a dance song by Swiss DJs Mike Candys and Jack Holiday. It was retitled "The Riddle Anthem" and released in November 2012.

Charts

Other cover versions

In 1999, Lightforce released an instrumental dance cover of the song titled "Take Your Time (The-Riddle '99)".

In 2009, the Italian group Prezioso & Marvin (actually the brothers DJ Giorgio Prezioso and Andrea Prezioso, and vocalist Alessandro Moschini known as Marvin) released it as a single from a similarly titled The Riddle EP. The single on Bang Record also featured vocals by Marvin (real name Alessandro Moschini) and was credited as Prezioso & Marvin. An official music video was also released.

In 2013, the French harpist Cécile Corbel included the song on her fourth studio album, SongBook vol.4 – Roses and gave the melody a Celtic coloration.

Notes

References

External links
 

1984 singles
1984 songs
1999 singles
2012 singles
Gigi D'Agostino songs
MCA Records singles
Nik Kershaw songs
Song recordings produced by Peter Collins (record producer)
Songs written by Nik Kershaw
ZYX Music singles